Tatarsky Uryush (Tatar Üreşe) is a rural locality (a village) in Uryush-Bittulinsky Selsoviet, Karaidelsky District, Bashkortostan, Russia. The population was 258 as of 2010. There are 9 streets.

Geography 
Tatarsky Uryush is located 54 km southwest of Karaidel (the district's administrative centre) by road. Krasny Uryush is the nearest rural locality.

References 

Rural localities in Karaidelsky District